The Hôtel de Paris Monte-Carlo is a hotel located in Monaco. It was opened in 1864 as part of the development of Monaco by the Société des bains de mer de Monaco. It has undergone a $280 million and more than four years complete renovation and reopened in March 2019.

Facilities 

The hotel has 99 rooms divided into four pricing categories.

Restaurants consist of the Michelin 3-star Louis XV, the Michelin 1-star Le Grill, Le Bar Americain and Em Sherif.

In popular culture

The hotel has been featured in numerous films, including Confessions of a Cheat (1936), The Red Shoes (1948), Iron Man 2 (2010), Monte Carlo (2011), and two James Bond films; Never Say Never Again (1983) and GoldenEye (1995). It was also portrayed in the 2012 animated film Madagascar 3: Europe's Most Wanted. It was a popular shooting location for photographer Helmut Newton.

References 

1863 establishments in Monaco
Paris Monte-Carlo
The Leading Hotels of the World
Paris Monte-Carlo
Paris Monte-Carlo
Monte Carlo
Second Empire architecture
Édouard Niermans buildings